Rhopalessa is a genus of beetles in the family Cerambycidae, containing the following species:

Rhopalessa clavicornis (Bates, 1873)
Rhopalessa demissa (Melzer, 1934)
Rhopalessa durantoni (Penaherrera-Leiva & Tavakilian, 2004)
Rhopalessa hirticollis (Zajciw, 1958)
Rhopalessa moraguesi (Tavakilian & Penaherrera-Leiva, 2003)
Rhopalessa pilosicollis (Zajciw, 1966)
Rhopalessa rubroscutellaris (Tippmann, 1960)
Rhopalessa subandina Clarke, Martins & Santos-Silva, 2011

References

Rhinotragini